The Palácio do Povo (People's Palace), formerly the Palácio do Governo (Government Palace), is a public building in the city centre of Mindelo in Cape Verde. It is situated at the eastern end of Rua Libertadores de África (formerly Rua Lisboa).
It was built in 1874, when there were plans to move the capital of Cape Verde to Mindelo. Originally with only one floor, it was expanded with a second floor between 1928 and 1934. Since independence (1975), it is called Palácio do Povo. It currently houses a Carnival museum.

See also
List of buildings and structures in São Vicente, Cape Verde

References

External links
Palácio do Governo - HPIP 

Buildings and structures in Mindelo
Portuguese colonial architecture in Cape Verde